The Men's Marathon T12 was held on September 17 at 7:30.

For the first time, there was no separate marathon held for athletes categorised T11 (totally blind). T11 athletes competed in the T12 marathon, against athletes with severe visual impairment (T12). The fastest finisher among the T11 competitors was Andrea Cionna of Italy, who set a new Paralympic record for his category, but finished in seventh place, six minutes behind gold medallist Qi Shun, who set a new T12 marathon world record.

Medalists

Results

See also
 Marathon at the Paralympics

References
Final

Athletics at the 2008 Summer Paralympics
Summer Paralympics
Marathons at the Paralympics
Men's marathons